Comcast Interactive Media (CIM) was a division of Comcast focusing on digital media. CIM was created in 2005 and originally led by President, Amy Banse, and Executive Vice President, Sam Schwartz. Comcast Interactive Media products included: www.comcast.net (portal), fancast.com, Fandango, thePlatform, and StreamSage.

On May 15, 2008, Comcast Interactive Media acquired social-networking site Plaxo for between $150 and $170 million, which was subsequently shut down on December 31, 2017.  On August 5, 2008, Comcast Interactive Media acquired newsletter service site DailyCandy for a rumored $125 million.

References

External links
 MyXfinity
 Fandango
 thePlatform

Online mass media companies of the United States
Former Comcast subsidiaries
2005 establishments in Pennsylvania